The Men's Greco-Roman competitions at the 2022 European Juniors Wrestling Championships were held in Rome, Italy between 27 June to 3 July 2022.

Men's Greco-Roman 55 kg 
 Legend
 F — Won by fall
WO — Won by walkover

Men's Greco-Roman 60 kg 
 Legend
 F — Won by fall

Men's Greco-Roman 63 kg 
 Legend
 F — Won by fall

Men's Greco-Roman 67 kg 
 Legend
 F — Won by fall

Top half

Bottom half

Men's Greco-Roman 72 kg 
 Legend
 F — Won by fall

Top half

Bottom half

Men's Greco-Roman 77 kg 
 Legend
 F — Won by fall

Top half

Bottom half

Men's Greco-Roman 82 kg 
 Legend
 F — Won by fall

Men's Greco-Roman 87 kg 
 Legend
 F — Won by fall

Top half

Bottom half

Men's Greco-Roman 97 kg 
 Legend
 F — Won by fall

Men's Greco-Roman 130 kg 
 Legend
 F — Won by fall

References 

Men's Greco-Roman